Truth was an American Contemporary Christian group, active from 1971 to 2001. Formed by John Roger Breland, the ensemble's name stands for "Trust, Receive, Unchangeable, True Happiness [in Jesus]". It was initially composed of some 15 members who toured extensively year-round, eventually recording frequently as well. It eventually expanded to 22 members and continued touring regularly for thirty years, dissolving in 2001. In 2000, the group was inducted into the Gospel Music Hall of Fame.

Beginnings 
The youth choir at Spring Hill Baptist in Mobile, Alabama, grew over the course of two years from 8 youth choir members to 140 members. Fueled by the inspiration the new Christian contemporary music that was sweeping the country, Roger began laying the groundwork for a new touring ensemble with vocals and a live band with horns. Wanting to name the group something with a distinctive identity that did not sound preachy or worldly, Roger's wife, Linda Breland, suggested Truth. The group hit the road in 1971. Traveling in three station wagons and a truck, the group sang in small churches, colleges, outdoor shopping centers and youth gatherings throughout the Southern United States. They were turned away many times from churches because of their contemporary sound. Many times they would do cover songs written by the Gaithers, including "Get All Excited" and "Because He Lives." They introduced Andrae Crouch's music to the deep south in the early 1970s.

In 1973 Truth performed "The Church Triumphant" to a standing ovation at the annual Southern Baptist Convention in Dallas, Texas. This opened doors for Truth all over the country. In 1981 Truth had its first of several number 1 songs with "Jesus Never Fails." In 31 years TRUTH traveled 3 million miles, presented 10,000 concerts in 27 nations, and recorded 61 albums with 400 members during their ministry.  The final concert was in Nashville on June 16, 2002.  The four-hour final concert was attended by hundreds of former Truth members and friends from around the nation.  Today Roger Breland continues the Truth sound at The University of Mobile as he directs and tours with The VOICES of Mobile.

"Jesus Never Fails" 
In 1981, Truth had been on the road for ten years. They had success in the local church but not much on the Christian radio stations. That all changed when Roger heard a song written by Gary Driskell entitled "Jesus Never Fails." The song was recorded as a duet with the rest of the group singing back-up, and it appeared on the 1982 album "Keeper of My Heart." The song rose to number one on the Contemporary Christian charts. Other duets by the group also performed well on the charts, such as "You'll Still Be Lord Of All."

The 1990s 
In 1990, Truth released its third Live album entitled Live. The album was also produced with a VHS tape. The group at the time featured Mark Harris, Andy Chrisman, Marty Magehee and Kirk Sullivan who would later start the group 4HIM.

In the 1990s, Roger Breland released a book that tells the history of Truth from the beginning until around 1990. It includes stories behind some of the music of the group, including some of the struggles of keeping Truth on the road, as well as the triumphant times.

40th anniversary tour
In January 2011, Breland began to assemble a new Truth group to celebrate the 40th anniversary of the group at the prompting of his sons. On July 31, 2011, the TRUTH40, One More Time Tour kicked off at Sherwood Baptist Church in Albany, Georgia. This concert was filmed live and sold in a DVD format at the product table on the tour. The tour also included the traditional Christmas Spectacular section from Thanksgiving until December 21, which was to be the final Truth concert, in Dallas, Texas. The tour was extended until April 27, 2012, with The final Truth concert performed at Oak Park Church of God in Mobile, Alabama. The final Truth album, The 40th Anniversary Collection, contains new arrangements of some of the old Truth hits (the most notable and different being "Majesty") as well a couple of medleys and three new Truth songs: "Right Here with You," "Your God Will Come," and "Love So Amazing."

50th Anniversary Reunion and Concert
On June 16th and 17th, 2022, TRUTH alums gathered in Mobile, Alabama for a 50th reunion.  An alumni banquet was held on Thursday, the 16th and a concert was held on Friday, the 17th at Cottage Hill Baptist Church.  The concert included some of the most talented singers and musicians in the country. Many of whom became well-known in the music industry after their experience with TRUTH, including Russ Lee, Tiffany Coburn, Jody McBrayer, Alicia Garcia, 4Him members, Natalie Grant, Steven V. Taylor, Leigh Cappillino, and Dick & Mel Tunney.  

Greg Golden, who served first as the sound tech for TRUTH in 1973 and then as booking agent for the group, summed up the evening: "I've been reflecting on the 50th anniversary and my 28+ years with TRUTH. To say that the Reunion Concert placed a 'period' —a simple dot— at the end of an amazing history and legacy would be an understatement and a disservice to the lives invested, the efforts expended, and the worldwide impact made. 

"Rather than a PERIOD, I see the four-hour and forty-song evening as an EXCLAMATION POINT to honor this remarkable and anointed ministry!"

Discography

Members (Partial List - Alphabetical)

References

External links

American gospel musical groups
Musical groups established in 1971
Musical groups disestablished in 2001